Koppies Dam Nature Reserve, is situated on the highveld of the Free State province of South Africa. The town of Koppies lies 55 km north of Kroonstad, just off the National road N1 between Kroonstad and Sasolburg. The nature reserve is 16 km east of the town, and is about 3 400 ha in size.

See also 
Department: Tourism. 

Nature reserves in South Africa
Protected areas of the Free State (province)